Dayshum was a Palestinian village, depopulated on 30 October 1948 by the Sheva Brigade of Israeli paramilitary force Palmach in an offensive called Operation Hiram, where the village has been destroyed, and only house rubble left behind.

History
In 1517 Dayshum was incorporated into the Ottoman Empire after it was captured from the Mamluks, and by 1596, it was a village under the administration of the nahiya ("subdistrict") of Jira (part of Safad Sanjak), with a population of fifty, all Muslim. They paid a fixed tax rate of 25% on a number of crops, including wheat, barley, olives, and fruits, as well as on other types of produce and property, such as goats, beehives, and a press that was used for processing either olives or grapes; a total of 2,112 Akçe. All of the revenue went to a Muslim charitable endowment.

Kabyles immigrants who had fought with Abd al-Qadir al-Jaza'iri against the French colonialists in the 1830s and 1840s settled at the site. These people may have come with him to the region following his defeat and banishment to Damascus in 1847. As some of their ancestors had been horsemen in Algeria, the villagers of Dayshum took a keen interest in raising horses.

In 1881  the PEF's Survey of Western Palestine described Dayshum  as a “well-built” village with about 400 residents. The village houses were situated on the side of a steep hill near the bottom of a valley and had gabled roofs. The village had three mills and several small gardens.

British Mandate
In 1921 inspectors from the British Mandatory Department noted a Maqam north-east of the village site, dedicated to a Sheikh Haniyya.

In the 1922 census of Palestine conducted  by the British Mandate authorities,  Daishum  had a population of 479, all Muslim,  decreasing slightly in the 1931 census of Palestine   to 438,  still all Muslim, in 102 inhabited houses.

In  the  1945 statistics  the population consisted of 590 Muslims, with a total of 23,044 dunams of land. Of this, a total 4,701 dunums of village land was used for cereals and 611 dunums were irrigated or used for orchards, while 17,093 dunams were classified as non-cultivable area.

Post 1948
In 1953, Dishon was established on village land.

In 1992, the village site was described: "Cactuses and thorns grow on the site. The only indications of the former existence of Dayshum are piles of stones from the destroyed houses and terraces. Moshav Dishon uses the land around the site for animal grazing and apple cultivation."

See also
 Depopulated Palestinian locations in Israel
 Killings and massacres during the 1948 Palestine War

References

Bibliography

External links
 Welcome to Dayshum, Palestine Remembered
Dayshum, Zochrot
Survey of Western Palestine, Map 4: IAA, Wikimedia commons
 Dayshum, at Khalil Sakakini Cultural Center
 Dayshum, Dr. Khalil Rizk.

Arab villages depopulated during the 1948 Arab–Israeli War
District of Safad